"The Day That My Heart Caught Fire" is a pop song written by Harry Vanda and George Young. It was recorded by Australian pop singer John Paul Young. The song was released in August 1978 as the second single from Young's fourth studio album Love Is in the Air (1978). The song peaked at number 20 on the Kent Music Report in October 1978.

Track listing 
7" (AP 11796) 
Side A "The Day That My Heart Caught Fire" (H. Vanda and G. Young) - 2:55
Side B "Lazy Days" (J. P. Young, Warren Morgan) - 3:29

Weekly charts

References 

1978 songs
1978 singles
John Paul Young songs
Songs written by Harry Vanda
Songs written by George Young (rock musician)
Song recordings produced by Harry Vanda
Song recordings produced by George Young (rock musician)
Albert Productions singles